Siciny may refer to the following places in Poland:
Siciny, Lower Silesian Voivodeship (south-west Poland)
Siciny, Kuyavian-Pomeranian Voivodeship (north-central Poland)

See also 
 Sicini, a tribe of flies